This is a non-definitive list of most expensive non-English-language films, with budgets given in United States dollars. Only films with budgets exceeding US$30 million are listed here.

Where the source gives the budget in the native currency, conversion is carried out using the exchange rates for the year of release as given by the Internal Revenue Service (since 2017) and The World Factbook (prior to 2017). In the absence of the exact year the closest year is used instead.

List

See also
List of highest-grossing non-English films
List of most expensive films
World cinema

References

External links
List of the most expensive French films
List of the sales quotes of French films produced in 2012 (p. 70-76)

Non-English